Tripidium bengalense, synonym Saccharum bengalense, with the common names munj sweetcane, baruwa sugarcane or baruwa grass, is a plant of the genus Tripidium native to Iran, Afghanistan, Pakistan, Northern India, Nepal, Bangladesh and Myanmar.

A primary native distribution area is northeastern India, particularly in Assam within the Terai-Duar grasslands in the foothills of the Himalayas.

Description
This is a small species of sugarcane bamboo grass, growing  in height. The plant is colored pinkish-green.

It is a food source for animals such as the Indian rhinoceros and the pygmy hog.

Uses

The species is used as a raw material for thatching roofs. It is used for making baskets. Its fibre is used for making ropes. Itis one of the ecologically successful native colonizer of abandoned mines. It forms pure patches on rocky habitats with skeletal soils. It forms extensive root network that binds the soil/pebbles and forms tall thick clumps with high biomass tufts. It is used by low income locals for making ropes, hand fans, baskets, brooms, mat, hut and shields for crop protection.
It is a choice species for stabilizing erosion-prone rugged slopes and their conversion into biologically productive sites of high socio-economic values.

References

Andropogoneae
Grasses of India
Flora of Afghanistan
Flora of Iran
Flora of Pakistan
Soma (drink)
Plants described in 1789